The Lo Nuestro Award for Rock/Alternative Artist of the Year  was an honor presented annually by American network Univision. The Lo Nuestro Awards have been held since 1989 to recognize the most talented performers of Latin music. The nominees and winners were originally selected by a voting poll conducted among program directors of Spanish-language radio stations in the United States and also based on chart performance on Billboard Latin music charts, with the results being tabulated and certified by the accounting firm Arthur Andersen. At the present time, the winners are selected by the audience through an online survey. The trophy is shaped in the form of a treble clef. The categories awarded were for the Pop, Tropical/Salsa, Regional Mexican and Music Video fields before the 2000 awards, and from the following year onwards categories were expanded and included a Rock field for Album and Performer of the Year.

The award was first presented to Colombian singer Shakira, the only female winner. Colombian performer Juanes was the most nominated and biggest winner in the category, with six wins out of nine nominations. Mexican band Maná won the award four times. Mexican singer Alejandra Guzmán and ensembles Café Tacuba and Motel were the most nominated acts without a win, with three unsuccessful nominations each. In 2013, all the categories in the Rock Field (Artist, Album and Song of the Year) were merged into the Pop Field.

Winners and nominees
Listed below are the winners of the award for each year, as well as the other nominees for the majority of the years awarded.

See also
 Grammy Award for Best Latin Pop, Rock or Urban Album
 Grammy Award for Best Latin Rock, Urban or Alternative Album
 Latin Grammy Award for Best Alternative Music Album
 Latin Grammy Award for Best Rock Album

References

Rock music awards
Latin rock albums
Rock/Alternative Artist of the Year
Awards established in 2010
Awards disestablished in 2013